The Andean states are a group of countries in western South America connected by the Andes mountain range. The "Andean States" is sometimes used to refer to all seven countries that the Andes runs through, regions with a shared culture primarily spread during the times of the Inca Empire (such as the Quechua language and Andean cuisine), or it can be used in a geopolitical sense to designate countries in the region that are members of the Andean Community trade group and have a local (as opposed to the Southern Cone) cultural orientation.

The Andes extend through the western part of South America in the following seven countries (arranged from north to south):

  (a part of Caribbean South America, not considered an Andean state in geopolitics)
  (also a part of Caribbean South America)
 
 
 
  (a part of the Southern Cone, generally not considered an Andean state in geopolitics)
  (a part of the Southern Cone, often not considered an Andean state in geopolitics)

When grouped as the "Andean states", the emphasis is on the mountainous regions of these countries.
  
Bolivia, Colombia, Ecuador, and Peru are parts of the Andean Community (a trade group), and each contains the Amazon rainforest and Amazonian indigenous people, as well as the Andean Mountains.

See also 

 Alpine states
 Amazon rainforest
 Andean Community
 Baltic states
 Brazilian Highlands
 Caribbean South America
 Himalayan states 
 Southern Cone
 The Guianas

References 

States
Regions of South America
Regions of the Americas